In March 2014, the United States Federal Communications Commission (FCC) voted to start the process of auctioning 65 MHz of AWS-3 spectrum, helping to meet the goals of the National Broadband Plan, and the most spectrum auctioned since the 2008 United States wireless spectrum auction. This was one of three auctions required for funding the FirstNet broadband network and other services. The PCS H block or AWS-2 auction raised nearly $1.6 billion of the $7 billion needed for FirstNet, with all licenses awarded to Dish Network. The AWS-3 auction, closed January 29, 2015, generated $44.9 billion. This involved 65 MHz of spectrum which would mostly be used by AT&T, Verizon and T-Mobile. The reserve price was $10.6 billion and the total expected was about twice that. AT&T bid $18.2 billion, Verizon $10.4 billion, and Dish Network $13.3 billion but expected to reduce its payments to $10 billion by using subsidiaries. T-Mobile bid $1.8 billion.

2014 in the United States
Federal Communications Commission
Spectrum auctions